The Samoa men's national field hockey team represents Samoa in international field hockey competitions and is controlled by the Western Samoa Hockey Association.

Results

Oceania Cup
2009 – 
2013 – 4th
2015 – 4th

Hockey World League
2014–15 – First round

Pacific Games
1979 -

See also

Samoa women's national field hockey team

References

Oceanian men's national field hockey teams
Field hockey
National team
Men's sport in Samoa